Shrek 2 (also known as Shrek 2: The Game and ported for the PC as Shrek 2: Team Action) is a 2004 action-adventure video game published by Activision, based on the DreamWorks Animation film of the same name. The game was developed by Luxoflux for the PlayStation 2, Xbox, and GameCube platforms, while a version for PC was developed by KnowWonder. The game received mixed to positive reception by critics.

Plot
Shrek 2s storyline follows a similar plot to that of the film. Shrek and Fiona are on a journey to the Kingdom of Far Far Away to visit Fiona's parents. Shrek's in-laws are not happy that a crude ogre is married to their daughter Fiona and turned her into an ogre, and the battle for acceptance ensues. The game covers things not shown in the film. Plot elements are delivered primarily through a storybook interface (text and illustrations) shown before each level.

Gameplay
GameCube, PlayStation 2 and Xbox versions:

In this version of the game, the player is able to play as Shrek or his friends and travel through 11 levels. In each level, the player controls a team of four characters, and can switch between them at any point. Each character has a unique ability that aids them in fighting enemies or moving through the environment (for example, Donkey can destroy obstacles and Fiona can slow down time).

The game is broken into different chapters, each with its own set of goals. One chapter requires the player to make sure three blind mice safely make their way to the witch's house. Other chapters have the player acting as a deputy in Far, Far Away Land—collecting bits of Humpty Dumpty, stealing treasure from a troll, helping the police clear out rioting hooligans from the streets, escorting Cinderella while she window-shops for a glass slipper, ridding the town of the Pied Piper's rat infestation, collecting chickens for a stew, or battling Puss in Boots via timed button presses.

Players play mini-games when they are not traveling on hazardous paths from point A to point B. Challenges that require the player's entire party include having to punch chickens into cook pots or a pen, escorting characters through a stage (Billy Goat Gruff and the three blind mice), and collecting fairies, jewels, etc.

The second type of mini-game, dubbed "Hero Time", gives one character a challenge to complete, usually emphasizing that character's particular skills displayed in the movie. Donkey at one point has to chase a fleeing onion wagon while riding on the back of Dragon. Fiona holds a private concert for a flock of black birds she is collecting for a pie (via exploding them by rhythm based button presses). Shrek has to throw a bunch of thugs into a paddy wagon.

Game Boy Advance version:

This version is a side-scroller with graphics resembling the Donkey Kong Country series, developed by Vicarious Visions. The game is separated into five chapters with a bonus level if the player collects all of the coins in each level. The story of the game is a compressed version of the movie it is based on. The playable characters are Shrek, Donkey, Puss in Boots, Human Shrek and Gingerbread Man, each with their own unique set of skills.

Development
Shrek 2 was created by Luxoflux and KnowWonder and published by Activision in 2004. The game is based on the film Shrek 2 by DreamWorks. TDK Mediactive announced the game at E3 in May 2003. Later that same year, TDK was acquired by Take-Two Interactive, resulting in losing the license to make Shrek games. Shortly after Activision announced in December that they would be working with DreamWorks to develop and publish video games based on the upcoming Shrek 2 movie, before they released the first trailer for the game in Spring of 2004.

Two versions of the game were released for the PC; one developed by KnowWonder for younger audiences using Unreal Engine 2, and the other a port of the original console release under the title Shrek 2: Team Action which was developed by Beenox.

The score for the game was composed by Kevin Manthei and Kevin Riepl. The soundtrack album consists of 58 tracks with over 65 minutes of score. It was released on May 6, 2004, by KMM Productions.

Reception

Shrek 2 received "mixed to positive" reviews from critics, except for the PC port, which received "generally unfavorable" reviews. GameRankings and Metacritic gave it a score of 72.56% and 72 out of 100 for the Game Boy Advance version; 72.27% and 70 out of 100 for the GameCube version; 71.92% and 71 out of 100 for the PlayStation 2 version; 71.29% and 72 out of 100 for the Xbox version; 62.90% and 55 out of 100 for the PC version; and 49% for the Mobile version.

IGN reviewer Mary Jane Irwin called the GameCube, Xbox, and PlayStation 2 versions of Shrek 2 "an amusing jaunt into the world of the movie," and Craig Harris, another reviewer of IGN, called the GBA version "an absolute treat, especially for those who dig the artstyle of the film," though he stated it to be "nothing new".

The game, along with fellow movie sequel based game published by Activision, Spider-Man 2, shipped more than five million units combined and were the best-selling titles of May and June, respectively.

In the United States, Shrek 2s Game Boy Advance version sold 700,000 copies and earned $18 million by August 2006. During the period between January 2000 and August 2006, it was the 35th highest-selling game launched for the Game Boy Advance, Nintendo DS or PlayStation Portable in that country.

By July 2006, the PlayStation 2 version of Shrek 2 had sold 850,000 copies and earned $26 million in the United States. Next Generation ranked it as the 70th highest-selling game launched for the PlayStation 2, Xbox or GameCube between January 2000 and July 2006 in that country. Combined console sales of the Shrek series reached 2.5 million units in the United States by July 2006.

References

External links

2004 video games
3D beat 'em ups
Activision beat 'em ups
Cooperative video games
Game Boy Advance games
Mobile games
GameCube games
PlayStation 2 games
Shrek video games
3D platform games
Xbox games
Unreal Engine games
Windows games
Video games about witchcraft
Multiplayer and single-player video games
Beenox games
Luxoflux games
Aspyr games
Video games based on works by Andrew Adamson
Video games developed in the United States
Video games scored by Kevin Manthei
Video games set in castles
Vicarious Visions games
Amaze Entertainment games